A Cry for Help is a 1912 American drama film directed by  D. W. Griffith.

Cast
 Lionel Barrymore as The Bum
 Walter Miller as The Doctor
 Lillian Gish as The Maid
 Harry Carey as The Thief
 Kate Bruce as Undetermined Role
 W. Christy Cabanne as Witness to Accident
 John T. Dillon as Policeman/Witness to Accident
 Dorothy Gish as Witness to Accident 
 Robert Harron as Witness to Accident
 Claire McDowell as Charity Patient
 Alfred Paget as Policeman

See also
 List of American films of 1912
 Harry Carey filmography
 D. W. Griffith filmography
 Lillian Gish filmography
 Lionel Barrymore filmography

References

External links

1912 films
1912 drama films
1912 short films
Films directed by D. W. Griffith
American silent short films
American black-and-white films
Silent American drama films
1910s American films